Hook, Line and Stinker is a 1958 Warner Bros. Looney Tunes cartoon directed by Chuck Jones. The title is a pun on the idiom Hook, Line and Sinker. The short was released on October 11, 1958, and stars Wile E. Coyote and the Road Runner. When shown on Boomerang USA, this short plays in PAL audio.

Plot
The Road Runner ("Burnius-Roadibus") is being chased by Wile E. Coyote ("Famishius-Famishus") as usual, until he stops and steps aside as the Coyote passes him. The Coyote skids to a stop, causing a cloud of dust to cover him, giving him a cloud beard. The Road Runner beeps and zooms off, lifting the pavement off the ground. The Coyote just stands there in shock as his jaw drops.

1. The Coyote, on a cliff, drops a washtub on the Road Runner on the road below, jumps on it and puts a stick of dynamite underneath it. The Road Runner zips up to him. The Coyote goes under the washtub to investigate why the bird isn't there and the dynamite blows up, encasing the Coyote in a tube made from the washtub.

2. The Coyote hides around a corner to bash the Road Runner with a sledgehammer. But the hammer falls off and the stick bashes the Coyote and chases him into the distance.

3. ACME bird seed is placed on some railroad tracks, but a train runs over the Coyote before he can get off the railroad.

4. Attached to a green balloon, the Coyote carrying a harpoon jumps off a cliff, tied to a rope. He misses the Road Runner, but the force carries him into a storm cloud. The harpoon attracts lightning which zaps the Coyote and dissolves the rope, causing him to fall.

5. Coyote unrolls a bundle of dynamite from its wires to a short underpass beneath the road. The Coyote heads back to his hiding spot, unaware that the wires and dynamite are rolling back to him and the detonator.  Thus, one push of the plunger blows him up.

6. Using a rope and a pulley, the Coyote raises a baby grand piano high above the road. As the Road Runner passes, the Coyote lets go of the rope, which sticks in the pulley. The Coyote jumps on top of the piano, which loosens the rope and causes the piano - and the Coyote - to drop to the ground. Dazed, the Coyote opens his mouth to reveal that the piano keys are now his teeth; he plays "Taps" on them briefly before passing out.

7. An elaborate Rube Goldberg-type gag ends the cartoon. A target and birdseed is placed on the road. Road Runner zips by and eats the seeds. The Coyote uses a tiny slingshot to knock loose a stick holding up a watering can suspended on a wooden yardarm. The can tips and water pours onto a plant which has a wooden match attached to it. The plant grows and the match strikes against a rock and lights a stick of dynamite. On top of the dynamite is a boot with a brick in it. The blast sends the boot on top of a teeter board, which rises and releases a mouse (with an extended tail) in a cage at the other end. The mouse runs to grab a piece of cheese on a scale. A weight on the other end of the scale falls, pulling the trigger on a rifle attached to a cliff. A bullet from the rifle ricochets off two metal bullseyes and knocks down an upright cannon. The wick on the cannon is lit by a nearby candle, which fires a cannonball that goes through two funnels and plummets on top of the unsuspecting Coyote instead of the curious Road Runner.  After the Coyote is bashed into the ground, the words "The End" appear on the cannonball.

Home media
VHS- Auntie Mame (A Night At The Movies issue)
VHS- Wile. E. Coyote Vs. Road Runner: The Classic Chase
VHS- Chariots Of Fur
VHS- The Stars Of Space Jam: Road Runner and Wile E. Coyote
DVD- Looney Tunes Golden Collection: Volume 6

See also
 Looney Tunes and Merrie Melodies filmography (1950–1959)

References

External links
 
 

1958 animated films
1958 short films
1950s Warner Bros. animated short films
Looney Tunes shorts
American animated short films
Short films directed by Chuck Jones
Wile E. Coyote and the Road Runner films
Animated films without speech
Films with screenplays by Michael Maltese
Films about Canis
Animated films about mammals
Animated films about birds